The ancient Egyptian Papyrus roll-tied and sealed hieroglyph comes in the common horizontal, or a vertical form (shown in photo). It is juxtaposed against an open scroll, the Papyrus roll-open hieroglyph, Y2.-.Aa29, without the "visible ties". The sealed form can also have a seal impressed (in clay) on the tie, for security, or authentication, (see notarization). Both styles of the papyrus roll, "-tied" or "-open", are an ideogram for "roll of papyrus", with a phonetic value of m(dj)3t.

Some artistic versions of the papyrus roll show the laminations, or grid-work, the cross-hatching of the papyrus fibers, for example on Thutmose III's cartouches.

Gallery

See also

Gardiner's Sign List#Y. Writings, Games, and Music
List of Egyptian hieroglyphs

References

Betrò, 1995. Hieroglyphics: The Writings of Ancient Egypt, Betrò, Maria Carmela, c. 1995, 1996-(English), Abbeville Press Publishers, New York, London, Paris (hardcover)
Budge, (1920), 1978.  An Egyptian Hieroglyphic Dictionary, E.A.Wallace Budge, (Dover Publications), c 1978, (c 1920), Dover edition, 1978. (In two volumes, 1314 pp. and cliv-(154) pp.) (softcover)

Egyptian hieroglyphs: writings-games-music